Andrew Pierce (born 1961) is a British journalist and broadcaster.

Andrew Pierce may also refer to:
Andrew Pierce (athlete) (born 1979), American former sprinter
Andrew Pierce (rugby league) (born 1974), Australian rugby league footballer
Andrew G. Pierce (1829–1903), American businessman and politician

See also 
Andy Pierce (fl. 1987–2013), frontman of Swedish band Nasty Idols
Andy Pearce (born 1966), English football defender